Pearl is the tenth studio album by the Bermudan singer-songwriter, Heather Nova. The album was released on June 28, 2019.

Background
As it is 25 years since the release of Oyster, Nova's second album from 1994, the themes of Pearl mirror those on Oyster. Reviewers have noted the rockier feel to the album Pearl in comparison to some of Nova's previous albums in the 21st century.

Nova worked with the music producer Youth on the album at his own studio in Spain. Youth was also the producer on Oyster and was enthused about this follow up album. Nova stated that there is a correlation between both Oyster and Pearl, saying 

Further links with Oyster include the song "Over the Fields". Nova states 

The album was preceded in some European countries by the single "Just Kids", on May 31, 2019, but in other countries, the first single released was "The Wounds We Bled".

Track listing

Personnel
Heather Nova – acoustic guitar, vocals, melodica
Vincent Lions – guitar
Midori Jaeger – cello and piano
Geoff Dugmore – drums
Youth – bass guitar

Charts

References

2019 albums
Heather Nova albums
Albums produced by Youth (musician)